Suborna Shirin is a Bangladeshi film and television actress. She was awarded Bangladesh National Film Award for Best Supporting Actress for her role in the film Biraj Bou.

Notable films
 Shuvoda (1986)
 Rajlokkhi Srikanto (1987)
 Biraj Bou (1988) 
 Sokhinar Juddho (1984)

Awards

References

External links
 

Living people
Bangladeshi film actresses
Best Supporting Actress National Film Award (Bangladesh) winners
Year of birth missing (living people)
Best Child Artist National Film Award (Bangladesh) winners